Klaus Werner Wedell CBE was a British educational psychologist with particular expertise in special needs education.

Career
In 1939, Klaus fled to Britain from Nazi Germany. After the war, he studied Psychology at the University of Cambridge. Wedell worked in Bristol and Hull and then was appointed to an academic post at the University of Birmingham.

In 1979, he was appointed to the first chair in Special Education at the Institute of Education in London from which he retired in 1995.

Work
Among other research areas, he was responsible for investigating the implementation of the 1981 Special Education Act. He consulted on special needs, in Britain and internationally.

He co-founded, with BECTA, the National SENCo Forum, an electronic support network.

Publications
Wedell had a regular Points from the SENCO-forum column in the British Journal of Special Education in which he published several articles including:
 Wedell, K. (2008). INCLUSION: Confusion about inclusion: patching up or system change? British Journal of Special Education.
 Wedell, K. (1995). Making inclusive education ordinary. British Journal of Special Education.

In 2004, he gave the Gulliford Lecture (established to commemorate Ronald Gulliford) at the University of Birmingham. This was subsequently published:
 Wedell, K. (2005). Dilemmas in the quest for inclusion. British Journal of Special Education.

Awards
 1955 - Honorary Fellow, British Psychological Society
 CBE

References

Academics of the University of Reading
British psychologists
Commanders of the Order of the British Empire
UCL Institute of Education